Justice Walters may refer to:

Jesse Walters, associate justice of the Idaho Supreme Court
Martha Lee Walters, associate justice of the Oregon Supreme Court
Mary Coon Walters, associate justice of the New Mexico Supreme Court